Feed the Machine is the ninth studio album by Canadian rock band Nickelback, and was released on June 16, 2017. It is the band's first release through record label BMG. Feed the Machine debuted at number five on the US Billboard 200 with 47,000 album-equivalent units.

Background
Following the release of their prior album, No Fixed Address, in 2014, the band cancelled the majority of their touring due to Chad Kroeger needing to have surgery to remove a cyst in his vocal cord. The band subsequently became bogged down in legal battles related to the cancellation of the tour.

The album was released on June 16, 2017. Shortly after the release of the album, the band began a 44-city tour on June 23, 2017 in North America, co-headlined with Daughtry, Shaman's Harvest and Cheap Trick as supporting acts.

Promotion and release
The album's first single, "Feed the Machine" was released on February 1, 2017. The second single, "Song on Fire", was released on April 28, 2017. On June 1, 2017, Nickelback made the song "Must Be Nice" available on their YouTube channel and gave it away to those who had pre-ordered the album. "Must Be Nice" was released to American rock radio stations on June 6, 2017 as the album's third official single and second rock single.

Commercial performance
Feed the Machine debuted at number five on the US Billboard 200 with 47,000 album-equivalent units, of which 43,000 were pure album sales. It debuted at number three in the UK, becoming their highest-debuting album of their career in that country. Later, it has been certified Silver by the BPI for sales in excess of 60,000 copies.

Track listing

Personnel
Nickelback
Chad Kroeger – lead vocals, guitar
Ryan Peake – guitar, keyboards, backing vocals
Mike Kroeger – bass guitar
Daniel Adair – drums, backing vocals

Other musicians
Nuno Bettencourt – guitar solo on 'For the River'

Production
 Chris Baseford – production, mixing 
 Chris Lord-Alge – mixing 
 Randy Staub – mixing 
 Ted Jensen – mastering

Charts

Weekly charts

Year-end charts

Certifications

References

Works cited

 

2017 albums
Nickelback albums